Ruf or RUF may refer to:

Charles Francis Ruf (1905-1985), American actor better known as Frank Faylen
Ruf Automobile, a German automobile manufacturer
Ruf Beats, a British hip hop record label
Ruf Records, a German blues record label
Reformed University Fellowship, a Christian campus ministry of the Presbyterian Church in America
RNA of unknown function
Revolutionary United Front of Sierra Leone
Darin Ruf (born 1986), American baseball player
Wolfgang Ruf (born 1941), German musicologist
Rapid Urban Flexible, dual-mode transit system
Ruf, a Japanese eroge studio, notably the developers for Yume Miru Kusuri